Abubekov (masculine) or Abubekova (feminine) is a Russian surname. It derives from a patronymic which in turn derives from the Turkic male given name Abubek—from Arabic "abū bakr", after Abu Bakr, a senior companion of the Islamic prophet Muhammad. The given name is popular among Sunni Muslims.

References

Notes

Sources
И. М. Ганжина (I. M. Ganzhina). "Словарь современных русских фамилий" (Dictionary of Modern Russian Last Names). Москва, 2001. 

Russian-language surnames
